Marataízes is a municipality located by the Atlantic Ocean in southern Espírito Santo, Brazil. It has a population of 38,883 and holds as such the highest density in the state. Marataízes is a tourist city.

The municipality contains the  Falésias de Marataízes Natural Monument, created in 2008 to protect the cliffs to the south of the town.

Gallery

References

Populated coastal places in Espírito Santo
Municipalities in Espírito Santo